The 1963–64 NBA season was the Bullets' 3rd season in the NBA and 1st season in the city of Baltimore.

Roster

Regular season

Season standings 

x – clinched playoff spot

Record vs. opponents

Game log

Awards and records 
Rod Thorn, NBA All-Rookie Team 1st Team
Gus Johnson, NBA All-Rookie Team 1st Team

References 

Washington Wizards seasons
Baltimore
Baltimore Bullets
Baltimore Bullets